The Canton of Hucqueliers is a former canton situated in the Pas-de-Calais département and in the Nord-Pas-de-Calais region of France. It was disbanded following the French canton reorganisation which came into effect in March 2015. It consisted of 24 communes, which joined the canton of Lumbres in 2015. It had a total of 8,182 inhabitants (2012).

Geography 
An area of small valleys and plateaux, consisting mostly of farmland, with the town of Hucqueliers in the arrondissement of Montreuil at its centre. 
The altitude varies from 26m (Alette) to 202m (Bécourt).with an average altitude of 97m.

The canton comprised 24 communes:

Aix-en-Ergny
Alette
Avesnes
Bécourt
Beussent
Bezinghem
Bimont
Bourthes
Campagne-lès-Boulonnais
Clenleu
Enquin-sur-Baillons
Ergny
Herly
Hucqueliers
Humbert
Maninghem
Parenty
Preures
Quilen
Rumilly
Saint-Michel-sous-Bois
Verchocq
Wicquinghem
Zoteux

Population

See also 
 Cantons of Pas-de-Calais
 Communes of Pas-de-Calais

References

Hucqueliers
2015 disestablishments in France
States and territories disestablished in 2015